Lhotsko is a municipality and village in Zlín District in the Zlín Region of the Czech Republic. It has about 300 inhabitants.

References

Villages in Zlín District